Claes-Göran Hederström (20 October 1945 – 8 November 2022) was a Swedish singer. He made his musical debut on Swedish television in 1967. In 1968 he represented Sweden in the Eurovision Song Contest with Det börjar verka kärlek, banne mej ("It's Beginning To Look Like Love, I'll Be Damned", English version named "My time has come") placing 5th. The song subsequently topped Swedish top 20 charts and today it is still his most recognised song.

Hederström died on 8 November 2022, at the age of 77.

References

External links

claesgoranhederstrom.com 
 
 

1945 births
2022 deaths
20th-century Swedish male singers
Eurovision Song Contest entrants for Sweden
Eurovision Song Contest entrants of 1968
People from Danderyd Municipality
Melodifestivalen contestants
21st-century Swedish male singers